The Belvedere of Embodying Benevolence (Manchu:  gosin be dursulere asari), Tiren Ge or Tiren Library is a building in Forbidden City's Outer Court, in Beijing, China.

References

External links

 

Buildings and structures in Beijing
Forbidden City